The 1991 Italian motorcycle Grand Prix was the fifth race of the 1991 Grand Prix motorcycle racing season. It took place on the weekend of 17–19 May 1991 at the Circuito Internazionale Santa Monica.

500 cc classification

250 cc classification

125 cc classification

Sidecar classification

References

Italian motorcycle Grand Prix
Italian
Motorcycle